Paul Newman (born 5 May 1971), also known as Tall Paul or Camisra, is an English DJ, producer and remixer who is best known for the songs "Rock da House" and "Let Me Show You".

Tall Paul
Tall Paul began his DJing career in 1985 at Turnmills, a nightclub his father owned. From there, Tall Paul became the resident DJ at the Gardening nightclub, Zap Club in Brighton and Trade in London, before headlining at various events in countries including the US, Brazil and Ibiza.

In 2001, Tall Paul released an album of "sanitized" music, Mixed Live Tall Paul.

Camisra
Before producing as 'Camisra' in 1998, Tall Paul created his first white label album entitled Love Rush in 1992. Hooj Choons record label controller Red Jerry subsequently remixed the album.  In 1998, Paul's Camisra entered the mainstream charts with the top-five hit "Let Me Show You".  Minor hits followed as Camisra before Paul went on to work with other projects.

Remixer
Tall Paul has also remixed songs for many artists, such as the Original's "I Luv U Baby", Liquid's "Sweet Harmony", the Stone Roses' "Fools Gold '95", Kool World Productions' "In-vader" and Mary Kiani's "100%".

Discography

Singles as Tall Paul
"Rock da House"
"Be There"
"Freebase"
"It's Alright"
"Precious Heart" 
"Got It"

Singles as Camisra

References

External links

1971 births
Living people
English DJs
English house musicians
English record producers
Electronic dance music DJs
Remixers